Xenothictis is a genus of moths belonging to the subfamily Tortricinae of the family Tortricidae.

Species
Xenothictis atriflora Meyrick, 1930
Xenothictis coena (Diakonoff, 1961)
Xenothictis dagnyana Razowski, 2013
Xenothictis gnetivora Brown, Miller & Horak, 2003
Xenothictis noctiflua Diakonoff, 1961
Xenothictis oncodes Razowski, 2013
Xenothictis paragona Meyrick, 1910
Xenothictis sciaphila (Turner, 1925)
Xenothictis semiota Meyrick, 1910
Xenothictis sympaestra Razowski, 2013

See also
List of Tortricidae genera

References

External links
Tortricid.net

Archipini
Tortricidae genera
Taxa named by Edward Meyrick